Owen James (born 13 October 2000) is an English professional footballer who plays as a forward for Stratford Town.

Career
James began his career in the Oxford United youth team at the age of 14, turning professional in October 2017. He made his senior debut on 5 May 2018, in a 2–1 league defeat against Blackburn Rovers. On 1 March 2019, James was loaned out to Oxford City for the rest of the season. However, in April 2019 he was loaned out to Stratford Town. In October 2019 he was loaned out to Bracknell Town. On 29 November 2019, he then joined Chalfont St Peter on loan for six weeks. The loan deal ended in January 2020, after 6 league appearances.

He was released by Oxford at the end of the 2019–20 season. Following his release from Oxford United, he moved to Chalfont St Peter on a permanent deal, but the season was again cut short due to COVID-19. In July 2021, he signed for Southern Football League Premier Division Central side Stratford Town.

Career statistics

References

2000 births
Living people
English footballers
Oxford United F.C. players
Oxford City F.C. players
Stratford Town F.C. players
Bracknell Town F.C. players
Chalfont St Peter A.F.C. players
English Football League players
National League (English football) players
Southern Football League players
Isthmian League players
Association football forwards